Burnwell is an unincorporated community located in Pike County, Kentucky, United States.

Burnwell meteorite
On 4 September 1990, at 3:45 PM, a meteorite fell through the porch of Arthur and Frances Pegg frightening a horse and a goat. The weight of the stone was 1504 grams and it was officially named "Burnwell". The meteorite was classified as an ordinary chondrite H4-an.

References

Unincorporated communities in Pike County, Kentucky
Unincorporated communities in Kentucky
Coal towns in Kentucky